Ronny Mauricio (born April 4, 2001) is a Dominican professional baseball shortstop in the New York Mets organization.

Career
Mauricio signed with the New York Mets as an international free agent in July 2017. He spent his first professional season in 2018 with the Gulf Coast Mets and Kingsport Mets, slashing .273/.304/.410 with three home runs and 35 RBIs over 57 games.

Mauricio spent 2019 with the Columbia Fireflies with whom he was named a South Atlantic League All-Star. Over 116 games, he batted .268/.307/.357 with four home runs and 37 RBIs. He did not play a minor league game in 2020 due to the cancellation of the minor league season caused by the COVID-19 pandemic. 

In 2021, Mauricio split the season between the Brooklyn Cyclones and the Binghamton Rumble Ponies, slashing .248/.296/.449 with twenty home runs, 64 RBIs, and 11 stolen bases over 108 games. He was selected to the 40-man roster following the season on November 19, 2021.

References

External links

2001 births
Living people
Dominican Republic expatriate baseball players in the United States
Baseball shortstops
Gulf Coast Mets players
Kingsport Mets players
Columbia Fireflies players
Tigres del Licey players
Brooklyn Cyclones players
Binghamton Rumble Ponies players